Félix Auger-Aliassime and Nicola Kuhn were the defending champions but chose not to defend their title.

Kevin Krawietz and Filip Polášek won the title after defeating Filippo Baldi and Luca Margaroli 7–5, 7–6(7–5) in the final.

Seeds

Draw

References
 Main draw

Hungarian Challenger Open - Doubles